In scholarship, the term Armenian tiara is used to refer to a spikey tiara that was characteristic of the coinage of Armenia during the Late Hellenistic period. It originated from the insignia used by the royal and satrapal authority in the Achaemenid Empire. The best known example was the one worn by the Artaxiad king of Armenia, Tigranes the Great.

The tiara was notably worn by Monobaz I, the king of Adiabene. It may have been done as part of propaganda to display that his kingdom had replaced Armenia as a regional power in the Near East.

Antiochus I of Commagene, the king of Commagene, adopted this tiara as an insignia of dominant power. The tiara, which he calls a kitaris was seen by him as a manifestation of the Persian and Orontid legacies.

References

Sources
 
 

Ancient Armenia
Crowns (headgear)